Engineering diffraction refers to a sub-field of neutron scattering which investigates microstructural features that influence the mechanical properties of materials. These include: 
lattice strain, a measure of distortion in crystals
texture, a measure of grain orientations
dislocation density, a measure of the microstructure
grain morphology

References

Neutron-related techniques
Scattering